Kenner is an unincorporated community in Clay County, Illinois, United States. Kenner is located along a railroad line southwest of Flora.

References

Unincorporated communities in Clay County, Illinois
Unincorporated communities in Illinois